Mechi Zone was one of the fourteen zones of Nepal, comprising four districts, namely,  Ilam, Jhapa, Panchthar, and Taplejung. The entirety of Mechi Zone has been redesignated as part of Province No. 1. There are many categorized monuments sites in Mechi zone.
Here is district wise List of Monuments which is in the Mechi Zone.

Mechi Zone
 List of Monuments in Ilam District 
 List of Monuments in Jhapa District 
 List of Monuments in Panchthar District 
 List of Monuments in Taplejung District

References

Mechi Zone